Promecoptera is a genus of ground beetles in the family Carabidae. This genus has a single species, Promecoptera marginalis. It is found in India.

References

Platyninae